Pope Macarius may refer to:

 Pope Macarius I of Alexandria, ruled in 933–953
 Pope Macarius II of Alexandria, ruled in 1102–1128
 Pope Macarius III of Alexandria, ruled in 1944–1945